Naoriya Pakhanglakpa is a census town in Imphal West district in the Indian state of Manipur.

Demographics
 India census, Naoriya Pakhanglakpa had a population of 6619. Males constitute 50% of the population and females 50%. Naoriya Pakhanglakpa has an average literacy rate of 79%, higher than the national average of 59.5%: male literacy is 85%, and female literacy is 73%. In Naoriya Pakhanglakpa, 10% of the population is under 6 years of age.

Politics
Naoriya Pakhanglakpa is part of Inner Manipur (Lok Sabha constituency).

References

Cities and towns in Imphal West district